The 1894 Indiana Hoosiers football team was an American football team that represented Indiana University as a member of the Indiana Intercollegiate Athletic Association (IIAA) during the 1894 college football season. Coached by Gustave Ferbert and Joseph R. Hudelson, Indiana compiled an overall record of 0–4–1. Kenneth Brewer, who played at tackle, was the team's captain.

Schedule

References

Indiana
Indiana Hoosiers football seasons
Indiana Hoosiers football